Chrysodinopsis is a genus of leaf beetles in the subfamily Eumolpinae. It was first described by the Czech entomologist Jan Bechyné in 1950. There are three described species in Chrysodinopsis. The genus is possibly synonymous with Brachypnoea.

Species
 Chrysodinopsis basalis (Jacoby, 1890) (Synonyms: Nodonota arizonica Schaeffer, 1906; Nodonota parkeri B. White, 1941) – Mexico, southern Arizona
 Chrysodinopsis cupriceps (Lefèvre, 1877) – El Salvador, Guatemala, Honduras, Mexico, Nicaragua
 Chrysodinopsis curtula (Jacoby, 1881) – Mexico

References

Further reading

 
 

Eumolpinae
Chrysomelidae genera
Articles created by Qbugbot
Beetles of North America
Beetles of Central America